Intrusive may refer to:

 Intrusiveness, a typically unwelcome behavior, interrupting and disturbing to others
 Intrusive rock, intrusion of molten magma leaving behind igneous rock
 Saltwater intrusion, the movement of saline water into freshwater aquifers
 Intrusive thought, an unwelcome involuntary thought, image, or unpleasant idea
 Linking and intrusive R, in phonetics

See also
 Intruder (disambiguation)
 Invasive (disambiguation)